Novobalapanovo (Yañı Balapan) is a rural locality (a village) in Baimovsky Selsoviet, Abzelilovsky District, Bashkortostan, Russia. The population was 417 as of 2010. There are 9 streets.

Geography 
Novobalapanovo is located 78 km northeast of Askarovo (the district's administrative centre) by road. Yenikeyevo is the nearest rural locality.

References 

Rural localities in Abzelilovsky District